The Gustav Vasa Bible is the common name of the Swedish Bible translation published in 1540–41. The full title is as appears on the right: Biblia / Thet är / All then Helgha Scrifft / på Swensko. The translation into English reads: "The Bible / That is / All the Holy Scripture / In Swedish".

The men behind the translation were Laurentius Andreae and the Petri brothers Olaus and Laurentius. Of them, Archbishop Laurentius is regarded as the main contributor. However, had the work not been commissioned by the Swedish King Gustav Vasa, who had in effect broken with the Pope in Rome in the 1520s, the work would not have been possible.

The Bible follows the German translation by Martin Luther from 1526 closely, not only in language, but in the fonts used and the typography as a whole. The Danish version, printed a few years earlier, also did this.

The Bible established the use of the Swedish language. It established a uniform spelling of words, particularly the infinitive ending -a instead of the more Danish-sounding -e, and defined the use of the vowels å, ä and ö.

This Bible was reprinted as a facsimile in 1938 and 1960. Few people today, however, are able to read the text with ease. This has to do partly with the spelling and partly with the typeface.

References
Nationalencyklopedin, article Gustav Vasa Bible

External links

1541 books
Early printed Bibles
Swedish books
Bible translations into Swedish
1541 in Christianity
Gustav I of Sweden